Gregory Duncan Woolf,  (born 3 December 1961) is a British ancient historian, archaeologist, and academic. He specialises in the late Iron Age and the Roman Empire. Since July 2021, he has been  Ronald J. Mellor Chair of Ancient History at University of California, Los Angeles. He previously taught at the University of Leicester and the University of Oxford, and was then Professor of Ancient History at the University of St Andrews from 1998 to 2014. From 2015 to 2021, he was the Director of the Institute of Classical Studies, and Professor of Classics at the University of London.

Early life and education
Woolf was born on 3 December 1961 in Hemel Hempstead, Hertfordshire, England. He was educated at Bexhill Grammar School, a grammar school in Bexhill-on-Sea, East Sussex. From 1981 to 1985, he studied ancient and modern history at Christ Church, Oxford. He graduated from the University of Oxford with a Bachelor of Arts (BA) degree in 1985; as per tradition, this was later promoted to a Master of Arts (MA (Oxon)) degree. From 1985 to 1990, he undertook postgraduate research in classics at Trinity College, Cambridge. He graduated from the University of Cambridge with a Doctor of Philosophy (PhD) degree in 1990. His doctoral supervisors were Peter Garnsey, Keith Hopkins, Ian Hodder, and Sander van der Leeuw. His doctoral thesis was titled "Cultural change in central France under Roman rule".

Academic career
Woolf began his academic career while still studying for his doctorate; he was a part-time lecturer at the University of Leicester and a research fellow of Christ's College, Cambridge. In 1990, after completing his doctorate, he moved to the University of Oxford to teach ancient history and archaeology. From 1990 to 1993, he was a Fellow of Magdalen College, Oxford. Then, from 1993 to 1998, he was a Fellow of Brasenose College, Oxford and a lecturer in the Faculty of Classics.

In 1998, Woolf moved to the University of St Andrews to become Professor of Ancient History. He was Head of the School of Classics between 2004 and 2009. During the 2009 to 2010 academic year, he was visiting fellow at the Max Weber Center for Advanced Cultural and Social Studies, University of Erfurt. On 1 January 2015, he joined the University of London as Professor of Classics and Director of the Institute of Classical Studies.

In July 2021, Woolf moved to the United States where he joined University of California, Los Angeles (UCLA) as Ronald J. Mellor Chair of Ancient History. In 2022, he became editor of the Journal of Roman Archaeology.

Woolf gave the Rhind Lectures for 2004/2005; the series was titled Men who turned towards the light: Cult and creativity in the Romans' world. The Rhind Lectures are a series of lectures on archaeology and they are hosted by the Society of Antiquaries of Scotland. In July 2012, he appeared on BBC Radio 4 as a guest on In Our Time to discuss Hadrian's Wall. In December 2012, he appeared again on In Our Time, this time to discuss the Cult of Mithras.

Honours
In 2016, he was elected a Fellow of the Society of Antiquaries of London (FSA), and a Member of the Academia Europaea (MAE). In July 2017, he was elected a Fellow of the British Academy (FBA), the United Kingdom's national academy for the humanities and social sciences. In 2021 he was elected a member of the European Academy of Sciences and Arts.

Selected works

References

 

 
 
 

Living people
Alumni of Christ Church, Oxford
Alumni of Trinity College, Cambridge
British classical scholars
Historians of ancient Rome
British archaeologists
Academics of the University of Leicester
Fellows of Magdalen College, Oxford
Fellows of Brasenose College, Oxford
Classical scholars of the University of St Andrews
Classical scholars of the University of London
Fellows of the Society of Antiquaries of Scotland
Fellows of the Society of Antiquaries of London
Fellows of the British Academy
People from Hemel Hempstead
1961 births
Historians of libraries